Agent M may refer to:

Agent M (band), Estonian rock group
Emily Whitehurst (born 1979), American singer, also known as Agent M
 A character portrayed by Michael Jackson in a cameo appearance in the film Men in Black II

Agent M (Producer), American Hip-Hop Producer/Composer. Born (1989) in Seattle WA, Mike Ehrhart, known as Agent M (@Agentmbeats), Composes original instrumentals